The Kitlope Range is a small subrange of the Kitimat Ranges, located southeast of Kitlope Lake in British Columbia, Canada. It is surrounded by the Tezwa and Kitlope Rivers.

See also
Kitlope (disambiguation)

References

Kitlope Range in the Canadian Mountain Encyclopedia

Kitimat Ranges